Mingxia is a Chinese feminine given name. Notable people with the name include:

Chen Mingxia ( 1601–1654)
Fu Mingxia (born 1978), Chinese diver
Wu Minxia (born 1985), Chinese diver
Yang Mingxia (born 1990), Chinese race walker 

Chinese feminine given names